Abdul Malek Bangladesh Nationalist Party politician. He was elected a member of parliament from Thakurgaon-3 in February 1996.

Career 
Abdul Malek joined the Bangladesh Nationalist Party in 1996 from National Awami Party. He was elected to parliament from Thakurgaon-3 as a Bangladesh Nationalist Party candidate in 15 February 1996 Bangladeshi general election. He was defeated in the 5th Jatiya Sangsad elections on 1991 as a candidate of National Awami Party and the 7th Jatiya Sangsad elections on 12 June 1996 as a candidate of Bangladesh Nationalist Party from Thakurgaon-3 constituency.

References 

Living people
Year of birth missing (living people)
People from Thakurgaon District
Bangladesh Nationalist Party politicians
6th Jatiya Sangsad members